The League for Catholic Counter-Reformation (CRC) is a nationalist and ultramontane organization founded in 1967 by Georges de Nantes, a former abbot who was suspended a divinis (from administering the sacraments) on 25 August 1966. The movement is composed of two religious communities in Saint-Parres-lès-Vaudes, in the Aube department, and in Quebec. It is considered a cult in France.

Beliefs
Georges de Nantes and deacon Bruno Bonnet-Eymard defend the thesis of the authenticity of the Shroud of Turin. According to the CRC, the relic was a victim of "fraud" in the carbon 14 analysis in 1988, fraud "premeditated" by the "mafia" of Freemasons ; the 1997 fire, which seriously damaged the Cathedral of Turin, where the Shroud is kept, would be a "final solution" found by "these hidden forces, that Freemasonry".

Status
The community of the Petits Frères du Sacré-Cœur de Jésus, which belongs to the CRC, was considered as a cult by French Commission on Cults in the 1995 report. In 1997, the Belgian parliamentary commission established a list of 189 movements containing the CRC (see Groups referred to as cults in government documents).

References

External links

Anti-Masonry
Anti-Marxism
Anti-Protestantism
Late Modern Christian anti-Judaism
Traditionalist Catholicism
Antisemitism in France
Far-right politics in France
Antisemitism in Quebec
Far-right politics in Canada
Christian organizations established in 1967
Christian denominations founded in France
Sedevacantists